Tephrella is a genus of tephritid  or fruit flies in the family Tephritidae.

Species
Tephrella decipiens Bezzi, 1913

References

Tephritinae
Tephritidae genera
Diptera of Asia